Merola is an Italian surname. Notable people with the surname include:

Gaetano Merola (1881–1953), Italian composer, pianist and opera manager
Mario Merola (1934–2006), Italian singer and actor
Virginio Merola (born 1955), Italian politician

See also
Merola Opera Program, opera training program in San Francisco, California, United States

Italian-language surnames